This is a timeline documenting the events of heavy metal in the year 2008.

Bands formed
A Sound of Thunder
A Storm of Light
Aeon Zen
Allegaeon
Amaranthe
Arkaea
Austrian Death Machine
Betraying the Martyrs
Bölzer
Bombus
Cain's Offering
Chickenfoot
Christian Mistress
City of Fire
Code Orange
Ex Deo
God Seed
Hamferð
Holy Grail
King of Asgard
Krypts
Lustre
Pallbearer 
Power Trip 
Revolution Renaissance
Solution .45
The Empire Shall Fall
Triptykon
Uneven Structure

Reformed bands
 At the Gates (for a few shows)
 Carcass (for touring)
 Einherjer (for touring)
 Exhorder (for a few tours and some new material)
 Forbidden (for a few shows)
 Krokus
 Living Sacrifice
 Spineshank

Disbandments
 Alabama Thunderpussy
 Beneath the Sky
 Byzantine
 Celtic Frost
 Dead to Fall
 Demigod
 The Duskfall
 From Autumn to Ashes
 Himsa
 Knorkator
 Ministry
 Sieges Even
 Sikth
 Still Remains
 The Red Death
 The Agony Scene
 Remove the Veil

Events
 Twiggy Ramirez rejoins Marilyn Manson in early January.
 Mikael Åkerfeldt rejoins Bloodbath in late January.
 Ola Frenning leaves Soilwork in February.
 Chris Broderick joins Megadeth in February.
 Timo Tolkki leaves Stratovarius after some internal troubles in March.
 Thomas Gabriel Fischer leaves Celtic Frost in April.
 Singer Lisa Middelhauve leaves Xandria in April.
 On May 11, original Rush drummer John Rutsey died in his sleep from an apparent heart attack.
 Blasphemer leaves Mayhem in May.
 Mike Kimball leaves Dying Fetus in May.
 On July 27, former White Spirit and Tank drummer Graeme Crallan died after a fall in a London street.
 Wes Borland joins Marilyn Manson's lineup in mid-August.
 D.R.I. guitarist Spike Cassidy makes a full recovery from cancer.
 Snot reforms with ex-Divine Heresy vocalist Tommy Vext.
 Michael Nicklasson leaves Dark Tranquillity in August.
 Jeff Singer leaves Paradise Lost in August.
 Christian "Witchhunter" Dudek, ex-drummer of Sodom, dies of liver failure on September 7.
 Christian Älvestam leaves Scar Symmetry in September.
 Peter Wichers rejoins Soilwork in September.
 Tormentor rejoins Gorgoroth in September, as does Pest in December.
 Denny Axelsson, vocalist of Blinded Colony, leaves the band.
 Former Marilyn Manson bassist Gidget Gein dies of a heroin overdose.
 Josh Freese plans to depart from Nine Inch Nails by the end of 2008.
 John Kempainen leaves The Black Dahlia Murder in December.
 Job For A Cowboy founding member and guitarist Ravi Bhadriraju leaves the band in late 2008.
 Al Glassman leaves Despised Icon to join Job For A Cowboy.
 Gaahl (ex-Gorgoroth) reveals his homosexuality.

Albums released

January

February

March

April

May

June

July

August

September

October

November

December

References

External links 
About.com: Heavy Metal

2000s in heavy metal music
Metal